Pedro Muñiz de Godoy y Sandoval was a Castilian Spanish noble, in the service of Henry II of Castile, and John I of Castile.  He was the Grand Master of several military orders including the Order of Alcántara, the Order of Calatrava, the Order of Santiago and adelantado of Andalucía. He was killed at the Battle of Valverde in 1385.

See also 
 Order of Calatrava
 List of Grand Masters of the Order of Calatrava

References 

Year of birth missing
1385 deaths
Spanish untitled nobility
Grand Masters of the Order of Calatrava
Grand Masters of the Order of Santiago
People killed in action